The 1940 Davidson Wildcats football team was an American football team that represented Davidson College during the 1940 college football season as a member of the Southern Conference. In their fifth year under head coach Gene McEver, the team compiled an overall record of 5–5, with a mark of 1–5 in conference play, and finished in 14th place in the SoCon.

Schedule

References

Davidson
Davidson Wildcats football seasons
Davidson Wildcats football